EPSR may refer to:

 Economic and Philosophic Science Review
 Electric Power Systems Research
 Employer Pension Scheme Reference is a unique reference given to an employer by the trustees or managers of personal pension scheme or multi-employer occupational schemes in the United Kingdom.
 European Plant Science Retreat is an annual congress organized by and for PhD students working in plant biology across Europe.
 European Political Science Review